Woodthorpe is a suburb in the south west of the city of York, in the unparished area of York, in the York district, in the ceremonial county of North Yorkshire, England. The surrounding areas are Dringhouses and Foxwood.

The area of Woodthorpe was built in several phases from the 1960s to the 1990s. The name Woodthorpe is believed to have been the name of one of the first large housing development projects around the Moorcroft Road and Acorn Way area and this name has stuck.  Locally the name Woodthorpe is generally used for the areas south of Acomb Wood and east to Moorcroft Road and Acorn Way. 

To the east is Dringhouses, to the north is Foxwood, and to the west is Acomb Park.

In January 2017 the suburb made national headlines when seven year old Katie Rough was killed by asphyxiation and stabbed in the neck near her home by a 15-year-old female.

Schools

The area has only one school, Woodthorpe Primary.

Pupils of secondary age usually travel to the new York High School or Millthorpe School.

References

Villages and areas in the City of York